Trachythorax is an Asian genus of stick insects in the family Lonchodidae and subfamily Necrosciinae.  Species have been recorded from the Indian subcontinent, Indo-China, Malesia through to New Guinea.

Species
The Phasmida Species File lists:
 Trachythorax chinensis (Redtenbacher, 1908)
 Trachythorax expallescens Redtenbacher, 1908
 Trachythorax fuscocarinatus Chen & He, 1995
 Trachythorax gohi Brock, 1999
 Trachythorax incertus Redtenbacher, 1908
 Trachythorax longialatus Cai, 1989
 Trachythorax maculicollis (Westwood, 1848)- type species (as Phasma maculicollis Westwood);synonyms include Calvisia atrosignata Brunner von Wattenwyl, 1893.
 Trachythorax planiceps Redtenbacher, 1908
 Trachythorax sexpunctatus (Shiraki, 1911)
 Trachythorax sparaxes (Westwood, 1859)
 Trachythorax unicolor Redtenbacher, 1908

References

External links
 

Lonchodidae
Phasmatodea genera
Phasmatodea of Asia